Aktepe is a village in the Besni District, Adıyaman Province, Turkey. The village is populated by Kurds of the Reşwan tribe and had a population of 295 in 2021.

References

Villages in Besni District

Kurdish settlements in Adıyaman Province